Pelmatops is a genus of tephritid fruit flies. They are sexually dimorphic, with females having shorter eye stalks than males. Eggs are usually laid in Rubus plants, wherein a larva usually lives within the stem of the plant until pupation.

Species  
 Pelmatops fukienensis Zia & Chen, 1954 
 ''Pelmatops ichneumone Westwood, 1850

References

Trypetinae
Tephritidae genera